Chavan-e Sofla (also Romanized as Chavān-e Soflá; also known as Chavān-e Pā'īn) is a village in Sarajuy-ye Gharbi Rural District, in the Central District of Maragheh County, East Azerbaijan Province, Iran. At the 2006 census, its population was 1,169, in 275 families.

References 

Towns and villages in Maragheh County